Littoraria scabra, common name : the mangrove periwinkle, is a species of sea snail, a marine gastropod mollusk in the family Littorinidae, the winkles or periwinkles.

Distribution and habitat
This species is distributed in the Red Sea, the Indian Ocean along Aldabra, Chagos, South Africa, Kenya, Madagascar, the Mascarene Basin, Mauritius, Mozambique, the Seychelles and Tanzania; in the Pacific Ocean along Hawaii and New Zealand. These snails live on rocky shores and on the mangroves.

Description
The size of an adult shell of Littoraria scabra varies between 15 mm and 40 mm. These shells are ovate-conical, without an umbilicus. The outer surface shows a spiral sculpture without nodules, with a pattern of irregular dark stripes. As in other bark-living snail species the shell color is brown. The mouth is rounded and the radula quite long, in order to adapt to the surface or the bark.

Biology
These snails are grazers on the roots, trunks, branches, and leaves of their host plants where they feed on zooplankton, bacteria, algae and mangrove tissues. These generalist herbivores daily vertical migrate along mangrove trees to avoid tidal submersion.

References

Bibliography
Barry Wilson – Australian Marine Shells Part 1 
Deepak Apte – The Book of Indian Shells – Bombay Natural History Society, 1998
Hsi-Jen Tao – Shells of Taiwan Illustrated in Colour 
Reid, D.G. (1986). The littorinid molluscs of mangrove forests in the Indo-Pacific region – British Museum (Natural History), London
Robert Tucker Abbott – Seashells of Southeast Asia – Graham Brash, 1991
Rosewater, J.   1970.   The family Littorinidae in the Indo-Pacific. Part I. The subfamily Littorininae. – Indo-Pac.  Moll.,2(11):417–506.
Rosewater, J.   1972.   The family Littorinidae in the Indo-Pacific. Part II. The subfamilies Tectariinae and Echininae. Indo-Pac. Moll., 2(12):507–528

Littorinidae
Gastropods described in 1758
Taxa named by Carl Linnaeus